Baja Saitovic Lukin is a Serbian writer. He was the winner of the Open Society Institute Roma Literary Award with Special Distinction.

References

External links

Serbian Romani people
Romani poets
Living people
Serbian male poets
Year of birth missing (living people)
Place of birth missing (living people)
Serbian writers